Ohyodogawa No.1 Dam  is a gravity dam located in Miyazaki Prefecture in Japan. The dam is used for power production. The catchment area of the dam is 941 km2. The dam impounds about 80  ha of land when full and can store 8500 thousand cubic meters of water. The construction of the dam was started on 1918 and completed in 1925.

See also
List of dams in Japan

References

Dams in Miyazaki Prefecture